Robert William Chapman may refer to:

 Robert William Chapman (engineer) (1866–1942), Australian mathematician and engineer
 Robert William Chapman (scholar) (1881–1960), British editor and book collector

See also
Robert Chapman (disambiguation)
 William Chapman (disambiguation)